Christian Warner (born 22 January 1976) is a former professional rugby union player. He represented the NSW Waratahs from 1997-2001 before heading to Europe. He is most notable for playing for Irish province Leinster Rugby from 2002-2008 as well as playing stints in France (Pau) and Italy (Roma) . Warner represented Australia at Under 19, 21 level and put in a memorable performance against the touring French side in 1997 for Australia A.

References

Leinster Rugby players
1976 births
Living people